Glassan or Glasson, also the Village of the Roses is a small village in rural County Westmeath, Ireland.

History and layout
The village was established and laid out to serve Waterstown House, the remnants of which is located on a hill south east of the village. The Harris-Temple family lived in Waterstown House which was built in the 1740s. The village is laid out as a straight street without a central square or common. At the south end the school was built to educate the children of the employees of the big house.

A small river known as the River Tullaghan flows through the northern end of the village and then flows south to Killinure Lough, a part of Lough Ree.

The core of the village consists of a late 18th/early 19th century terrace of two-storey rose-covered houses. Suburban development has taken place on all approaches to the village in recent times.

The village is overlooked by Caraun Hill, particularly so when approaching the village from the direction of Lough Ree.
The village school was built for Isabella Harris who believed that education was one of the elements which could prevent the repetition of the distress experienced during the famine of the 1840s.

Amenities
Services and businesses in the village include two pubs, both with restaurants, a restaurant in the Old Garda Barracks (Called Glasson Village Restaurant), a hairdresser, Garda Station, automotive sales and repair garages, a heritage/community centre (in the old school house), service station and supermarket, a number of B&Bs, a concrete works, a stonemason's workshop, a defunct petty sessions court house, a former Royal Irish Constabulary Barracks, a dispensary operated by the Health Board, and a reproduction water pump installed by the Tidy Towns (ignoring the locations of several original pumps in the village which had been stolen).

Glassan also hosts two hunts; namely the Glassan Farmers Hunt and the South Westmeath Harriers.

Close to the village in an area which was originally the deer park of the Waterstown demesne is Wine Port, so named because wine was brought from France and Spain by boat and landed here, and brought to the cellars under the house by cart.

Waterston House
The village of Glasson was built to service Waterston House, home of the Temple-Harris family. It is one of many Irish villages which were built to service an estate, or 'Big House'. Other examples of planned villages associated with such estates are Celbridge (Castletown House), Westport (Westport House), Durrow (Durrow Castle), and Kildare (Carton House).

All that remains of Waterston House is a corner of two of the original facades, remains of the house basement, the farmyard, the walled garden, the pigeon loft and some minor structures. What is lost is the rest of the house, the decorative terraced gardens, the castle on an island on the lake, the canals, woods, and shipyards.

See also
List of towns and villages in Ireland

References

Towns and villages in County Westmeath